Helmstedt (Eastphalian: Helmstidde) is a town on the eastern edge of the German state of Lower Saxony. It is the capital of the District of Helmstedt. The historic university and Hanseatic city conserves an important monumental heritage of Romanesque and Renaissance buildings, as well as numerous timber framed houses. During the German partition the nearby Bundesautobahn 2 was the site of the Helmstedt–Marienborn border crossing, the most important on the former inner German border as starting point of the shortest land route between West Germany and West Berlin.

Geography
Helmstedt is situated in a basin between the Elm and Lappwald hill ranges, at the transition area between the northern foothills of the Harz mountains and the North German Plain. It is surrounded by the Elm-Lappwald Nature Park.

Helmstedt currently has about 25,000 inhabitants (2015).

History
The settlement in the Duchy of Saxony was first mentioned as Helmonstede in a 952 deed issued by the German king Otto I. In former times also called Helmstädt, the town developed in the vicinity of the Benedictine St. Ludger's Abbey that was founded around 800 by Saint Liudger as a mission station. Helmstedt's town privileges were documented in 1247. It belonged to the Abbacy of Werden until 1490, when it was bought by the Duchy of Brunswick-Lüneburg. From 1576 to 1810, the University of Helmstedt was located here.

From the late 1940s to 1990, the town was the site of a major border crossing between the Federal Republic of Germany and the German Democratic Republic.  The main rail and autobahn route between West Germany and Berlin, across the GDR, began at the Helmstedt–Marienborn border crossing, also known as Checkpoint Alpha. Official military traffic from NATO countries to West Berlin was only allowed to use this route.

Transport 

The town lies on the Brunswick-Magdeburg railway.

Notable people

Franz Heinrich Ludolf Ahrens (1809–1881), philologist
Bibiana Beglau (born 1971), actress
Victor von Bruns (1812–1883), physician and plastic surgeon
Georg Fein (1803–1869), journalist and democratic politician of Vormärz, founder and organizer of Workers' Educational Association
Peter Feldmann (born 1958), politician, mayor (SPD) of Frankfurt since 2012
Johann Andreas Graeffer (1746–1802), botanist and nurseryman remembered by garden historians as having introduced a number of exotic plants to British gardens 
Asta Hampe (1907– 2003), engineer, physicist, economist and statistician 
Johann Christian Friedrich Heyer (1793–1873), the first missionary who was sent abroad by Lutherans in the US
Hans Krebs (1898–1945), military officer and chief of staff of the Wehrmacht
Rudolf Leuckart (1822–1898), biologist and founder of parasitology
Anton August Heinrich Lichtenstein (1753–1816), zoologist and librarian
Johann Heinrich Meibom (1590–1655), physician and professor of medicine at the University of Helmstedt
Karl Reinhard (1769–1840), writer and editor of the Göttingen Musenalmanach
Stefan Rinke (born 1965), historian and specialist in Latin American history
Theodor von Schubert (1758–1825), astronomer
Paul Gottlieb Werlhof (1699–1767), Royal Hanoverian court physician and poet
Andree Wiedener (born 1970), footballer

In addition, see the list of famous students and professors of the University of Helmstedt.

Twin towns – sister cities

Helmstedt is twinned with:

 Albuquerque, United States
 Chard, England, United Kingdom
 Fiuggi, Italy
 Haldensleben, Germany
 Orăştie, Romania
 Svietlahorsk, Belarus
 Vitré, France

References

External links

 
District Emmerstedt (in German)
Helmstedt-CITYTOUR (photo-gallery)
Map of Helmstedt
Photos and information on Helmstedt's role in Allied military rail operations in 1969-70
Riding with the locomotive engineer (engine driver) across the former intra-German frontier in 2005

Helmstedt (district)
Members of the Hanseatic League
Duchy of Brunswick